CIMA was a Canadian AM radio station located in Vancouver, British Columbia from 1986 to 1992 .

History
CIMA signed on for the first time as CIOF on September 2, 1986. The station offered an adult contemporary format and was originally owned by Don Hamilton. Over the course of the station's six-year history, the format changed from AC to Top 40 to active rock to Top 40 to AC and finally on adult standards.

In 1992, the CRTC authorized Western World Communications (the owners of CKST 800) to buy CIMA. Under the request of Western World Communications, CIMA would sign off and CKST would be free to use CIMA's former frequencies and move their transmitters to CIMA's.

CIMA left the air on February 4, 1992.

References

External links
 Decision CRTC 85-1054
 Decision CRTC 92-27
 

IMA
IMA
Radio stations established in 1986
1986 establishments in British Columbia
1992 disestablishments in British Columbia
Radio stations disestablished in 1992
IMA (AM)